The Legion National Youth Track and Field Championships is an annual track and field competition organized by the Royal Canadian Legion and sanctioned by Athletics Canada. It serves as the Canadian youth national championships for the sport.

History

The Royal Canadian Legion has been involved in youth athletics since the 1950s. In 1977 the first Legion National Youth Track and Field Championships were held at Oromocto, New Brunswick. In 2010 the Championships were designated as the national youth championships by Athletics Canada.

Host Locations

References

Track and field in Canada